Gay American Indians (GAI) was a gay rights organization founded in San Francisco in 1975 by Randy Burns (Northern Paiute) and Barbara May Cameron (Hunkpapa Lakota). It was notable for being the first association for queer Native Americans in the United States. Although initially a social group, GAI became involved in AIDS and Two-Spirit activism.

History
The founding of GAI took place in the context of the Red Power and gay liberation movements. Originally, it acted as a gathering space for gay and lesbian Natives from across the Bay Area, who were excluded from the gay bars in the Castro district because of their race. GAI was also intended to serve as a "support group," as queer American Indians were excluded not only from the majority-white gay community but from Indigenous communities as well, which often associated queerness with colonization. Within five years of its founding, GAI was 150 strong; it reached 1,000 participants in 1988.

The organization began the GAI History Project in 1984 to collect the oral records and traditions of queerness in Indigenous tribes. Subsequently, in 1988, GAI and the History Project, with the help of white anthropologist Will Roscoe, published Living the Spirit: A Gay American Indian Anthology. Living the Spirit contained fiction, non-fiction, and poetry, as well as visual art, from gay Native contributors, with a particular focus on Two-Spirits. It also included a list of 133 tribes' different words and identities for Two-Spirit people. The scholar Lisa Tatonetti has called it "the first... anthology devoted solely to the writing of queer Native people." Noted Mohawk poet Maurice Kenny, a contributor to the anthology, was connected to GAI, though not a member.

Activism 
GAI's work started within the organization, through facilitating mutual aid and creating a "network" for its members. Once it became more politically active, GAI became involved in organizing for prominent Indigenous issues like "land rights, water rights, and fishing rights." One of its main causes was fighting the effects of the AIDS epidemic on Native Americans. Many AIDS organizations in the Bay Area reached out primarily to white communities, and there was limited support inside Native tribes for those fighting the virus. To fill this vacuum, GAI helped to found both the Indian AIDS Project and the American Indian AIDS Institution to provide resources for queer Natives. Co-founder Randy Burns commented in 2015 that 82 members of GAI had died of AIDS.

A continuation of GAI's work from Living the Spirit was its promotion of the term "Two-Spirit" over the anthropological term "berdache." "Berdache," likely taken from the French for "passive male partner," was considered by GAI to be colonialist and offensive, as well as imprecise. At the 1992 Annual Meeting of the American Anthropological Association, members of GAI met with anthropologists from the AAA to advocate for the substitution of the scholarly usage of "berdache" with "Two-Spirit." At later conferences, anthropologists began addressing this terminology issue themselves, and the word was disavowed.

Records
Records from GAI are held by the GLBT Historical Society.

References

1975 establishments in California
LGBT culture in San Francisco
LGBT Native American culture
LGBT political advocacy groups in California
Native American history of California
Native American rights organizations
Organizations established in 1975